The First Indochina War (generally known as the Indochina War in France, and as the Anti-French Resistance War in Vietnam) began in French Indochina from 19 December 1946 to 20 July 1954 between France and Việt Minh (Democratic Republic of Vietnam), and their respective allies. Việt Minh was led by Võ Nguyên Giáp and Hồ Chí Minh. Most of the fighting took place in Tonkin in Northern Vietnam, although the conflict engulfed the entire country and also extended into the neighboring French Indochina protectorates of Laos and Cambodia.

At the Potsdam Conference in July 1945, the allied Combined Chiefs of Staff decided that Indochina south of latitude 16° north was to be included in the Southeast Asia Command under British Admiral Mountbatten. On V-J Day, September 2, Hồ Chí Minh proclaimed in Hanoi (Tonkin's capital) the establishment of the Democratic Republic of Vietnam (DRV). In late September 1945, Chinese forces entered Tonkin, and Japanese forces to the north of that line surrendered to Generalissimo Chiang Kai-shek. At the same time, British forces landed in Saigon (Cochinchina's capital), and Japanese forces in the south surrendered to the British. The Chinese accepted the DRV under Hồ Chí Minh, then in power in Hanoi. The British refused to do likewise in Saigon, and deferred to the French, against the ostensible support of the Việt Minh by American OSS representatives. The DRV ruled as the only civil government in all of Vietnam for a period of about 20 days, after the abdication of Emperor Bảo Đại, who had governed under the Japanese rule. On 23 September 1945, with the knowledge of the British commander in Saigon, French forces overthrew the local DRV government, and declared French authority restored in Cochinchina. Guerrilla warfare began around Saigon immediately, but the French gradually retook control of Indochina. Hồ Chí Minh agreed to talk with France but negotiations failed. After one year of low-level conflict, all-out war broke out in December 1946 between French and Việt Minh forces as Hồ Chí Minh and his government went underground. The French tried to stabilize Indochina by reorganizing it as a Federation of Associated States. In 1949, they put former Emperor Bảo Đại back in power, as the ruler of a newly established State of Vietnam.

The first few years of the war involved a low-level rural insurgency against the French. By 1949 the conflict had turned into a conventional war between two armies equipped with modern weapons, with the French supplied by the United States, and the Việt Minh supplied by the Soviet Union and a newly communist China. French Union forces included colonial troops from the empire - North Africans; Laotian, Cambodian and Vietnamese ethnic minorities; Sub-Saharan Africans - and professional French troops, European volunteers, and units of the Foreign Legion. The use of metropolitan recruits was forbidden by the government to prevent the war from becoming more unpopular at home. It was called the "dirty war" (la sale guerre) by leftists in France.

The French strategy of inducing the Việt Minh to attack well-defended bases in remote areas of at the end of their logistical trails was validated during the Battle of Nà Sản. French efforts were hampered by the limited usefulness of tanks in a forested environment, the lack of a strong air force, and reliance on soldiers from French colonies. The Việt Minh used novel and efficient tactics, including direct artillery fire, convoy ambushes, and anti-aircraft weaponry to impede land and air resupplies together with a strategy based on recruiting a sizable regular army facilitated by large popular support. They used guerrilla warfare doctrine and instruction developed from China, and used war materiel provided by the Soviet Union. This combination proved fatal for the French bases, culminating in a decisive French defeat at the Battle of Dien Bien Phu.

An estimated 400,000 to 842,707 soldiers died during the war as well as between 125,000 and 400,000 civilians. Both sides committed war crimes during the conflict, including killings of civilians (such as the Mỹ Trạch massacre by French troops), rape and torture. At the International Geneva Conference on July 21, 1954, the new socialist French government and the Việt Minh made an agreement which gave the Việt Minh control of North Vietnam above the 17th parallel, an agreement that was rejected by the State of Vietnam and the United States. A year later, Bảo Đại would be deposed by his prime minister, Ngô Đình Diệm, creating the Republic of Vietnam (South Vietnam). Soon an insurgency, backed by the communist north, developed against Diệm's anti-communist government. This conflict, known as the Vietnam War, included large U.S. military intervention in support of the South Vietnamese and ended in 1975 with the defeat of South Vietnam to the North Vietnamese and the reunification of Vietnam.

Background

Vietnam was absorbed into French Indochina in stages between 1858 and 1887. Vietnamese nationalism grew until World War II, providing a break in French control. Early Vietnamese resistance centered on the intellectual Phan Bội Châu. Châu looked to Japan, which had modernized and was one of the few Asian nations to successfully resist European colonization. With Prince Cường Để, Châu started the two organizations in Japan, the Duy Tân hội (Modernistic Association) and Vietnam Cong Hien Hoi.

Due to French pressure, Japan deported Phan Bội Châu to China. Witnessing Sun Yat-sen's Xinhai Revolution, Châu was inspired to commence the Viet Nam Quang Phục Hội movement in Guangzhou. From 1914 to 1917, he was imprisoned by Yuan Shikai's counterrevolutionary government. In 1925, he was captured by French agents in Shanghai and spirited to Vietnam. Due to his popularity, Châu was spared from execution and placed under house arrest until his death in 1940.

In September 1940, shortly after Phan Bội Châu's death, the Empire of Japan launched its invasion of French Indochina, mirroring its ally Germany's conquest of metropolitan France. Keeping the French colonial administration, the Japanese ruled from behind the scenes in a parallel of Vichy France. As far as Vietnamese nationalists were concerned, this was a double-puppet government. Emperor Bảo Đại collaborated with the Japanese, just as he had with the French, ensuring his lifestyle could continue.

From October 1940 to May 1941, during the Franco-Thai War, the Vichy French in Indochina defended their colony in a border conflict in which the forces of Thailand invaded while the Japanese sat on the sidelines. Thai military successes were limited to the Cambodian border area, and in January 1941 Vichy France's modern naval forces soundly defeated the inferior Thai naval forces in the Battle of Ko Chang. The war ended in May, with the French agreeing to minor territorial revisions which restored formerly Thai areas to Thailand.

In 1941, Hồ Chí Minh, seeing communist revolution as the path to freedom, returned to Vietnam and formed the Viet Nam Doc Lap Dong Minh Hoi (League for the Independence of Vietnam), better known as the Việt Minh. Ho created the Việt Minh as an umbrella organization for all the nationalist resistance movements, de-emphasizing his communist social revolutionary background.

During the Vietnamese famine of 1945, Hồ Chí Minh blamed ruthless Japanese exploitation and poor weather for up to two million Vietnamese deaths. The Việt Minh arranged a relief effort in the north, winning wide support there as a result.

In Hanoi on 15–20 April 1945 the Tonkin Revolutionary Military Conference of the Việt Minh issued a resolution that was reprinted on pages 1–4 on 25 August 1970 in the Nhân Dân journal. It called for a general uprising, resistance and guerilla warfare against the Japanese by establishing 7 war zones across Vietnam named after past heroes of Vietnam, calling for propaganda to explain to the people that their only way forward was violent resistance against the Japanese and exposing the Vietnamese puppet government that served them. The conference also called for training propagandists and having women spread military propaganda and target Japanese soldiers with Chinese language leaflets and Japanese language propaganda. The Việt Minh's Vietnamese Liberation Army published the "Resistance against Japan" (Khang Nhat) newspaper. They also called for the creation of a group called "Chinese and Vietnamese Allied against Japan" by sending leaflets to recruit overseas Chinese in Vietnam to their cause.  The resolution called on forcing French in Vietnam to recognize Vietnamese independence and for the DeGaulle France (Allied French) to recognize their independent and cooperate with them against Japan.

On 17 August 1970, the North Vietnamese National Assembly Chairman Truong Chinh reprinted an article in Vietnamese in Nhan Dan, published in Hanoi titled "Policy of the Japanese Pirates Towards Our People" which was a reprint of his original article written in August 1945 in No 3 of the "Communist Magazine" (Tap Chi Cong San) with the same title, describing Japanese atrocities like looting, slaughter and rape against the people of north Vietnam in 1945. He denounced the Japanese claims to have liberated Vietnam from France with the Greater East Asia Co-prosperity Sphere announced by Tojo and mentioned how the Japanese looted shrines, temples, eggs, vegetables, straw, rice, chickens, hogs and cattle for their horses and soldiers and built military stations and airstrips after stealing land and taking boats, vehicles, homes and destroying cotton fields and vegetable fields for peanut and jute cultivation in Annam and Tonkin. Japan replaced the French government on 9 March 1945 and started openly looting the Vietnamese even more in addition to taking French owned properties and stole watches, pencils, bicycles, money and clothing in Bac Giang and Bac Can. The Japanese tried to play the Vietnamese against the French and play the Laotians against the Vietnamese by inciting Lao people to killed Vietnamese as Lao murdered 7 Vietnamese officials in Luang Prabang and Lao youths were recruited to an anti-Vietnam organization by the Japanese when they took over Luang Prabang. The Japanese spread false rumours that the French were massacring Vietnamese at the time to distract the Vietnamese from Japanese atrocities. The Japanese created groups to counter the Viet Minh Communists like Vietnam Pao ve doan (Vietnam protection group) and Vietnam Ai quoc doan (Vietnam Patriotic Group) to force Vietnamese into coolie labour, take taxes and rice and arrested anti-Japanese Vietnamese with their puppet government run by Tran Trong Kim. The Viet Minh rejected the Japanese demands to cease fighting and support Japan, so the Japanese implemented the Three Alls policy (San Kuang) against the Vietnamese, pillaging, burning, killing, looting, and raping Vietnamese women. The Vietnamese called the Japanese "dwarfed monsters" (Wa (Japan)) and the Japanese committed these atrocities in Thai Nguyen province at Dinh Hoa, Vo Nhai and Hung Son. The Japanese attacked the Vietnamese while masquerading as Viet Minh and used terror and deception. The Japanese created the puppet Vietnam Phuc quoc quan (Vietnam restoration army). and tried to disrupt the Viet Minh's redistribution and confiscation of property of pro-Japanese Vietnamese traitors by disguising themselves as Viet Minh and then attacking people who took letters from them and organizing anti-French rallies and Trung sisters celebrations. Japanese soldiers tried to infiltrate Viet Minh bases with Viet Minh flags and brown trousers during their fighting. The Japanese murdered, plundered and raped Vietnamese and beheaded Vietnamese who stole bread and corn  while they were starving according to their martial law. They shot a Vietnamese pharmacy student to death outside of his own house when he was coming home from guard duty at a hospital after midnight in Hanoi and also shot a defendant for a political case in the same city. In Thai Nguyen province, Vo Nhai, a Vietnamese boat builder was thrown in a river and had his stomach stabbed by the Japanese under suspicion of helping Viet Minh guerillas. The Japanese slit the abdomen and hung the Dai Tu mayor upside down in Thai Nguyen as well. The Japanese also beat thousands of people in Hanoi for not cooperating. Japanese officers ordered their soldiers to behead and burn Vietnamese. Truong Chinh said that the Japanese wanted to plunder Asians for their own market and take it from the United States and Great Britain and were imperialists with no intent on liberating Vietnam.

Truong Chinh wrote another article on 12 September 1945, No 16 in Liberation Banner (Co Giai Phong) which was also reprinted on 16 August 1970 in Nhan Dan.  He commemorated the August revolution against the Japanese, after the Japanese surrendered on 15 August 1945 then the Viet Minh started attacking and slaughtering Japanese and disarming them in a nationwide rebellion on 19 August 1945. The Japanese had already disarmed the French and the Japanese themselves lost morale so the Viet Minh managed to seize control after attacking the Japanese. Viet Minh had begun fighting in 1944, when the French were attacked on Dinh Ca in October 1944 and in Cao Bang and Bac Can French were attacked by Viet Cong in November 1944 and the French and Japanese fought each other on 9 March 1945, so in Tonkin the Viet Cong began disarming French soldiers and attacking the Japanese.  In Quang Ngai, Ba To, Yen Bai and Nghia Lo political prisoners escaped Japanese were attake din Son La by Meo (Hmong) tribesmen and in Hoa Binh and Lang Son by Muong tribesmen.  Viet Minh took control of 6 provinces in Tonkin after 9 March 1945 within 2 weeks. The Viet Minh led a brutal campaign against the Japanese where many died from 9 March 1945 to 19 August 1945. Truong Chinh ended the article with a quote from Sun Yatsen, "The revolution is not yet won, All comrades must continue their al out efforts!"

On 26 September 1945 Ho Chi Minh wrote a letter calling for struggle against the French mentioning they were returning after they sold out the Vietnamese to the Japanese twice in 4 years.

The Japanese forced Vietnamese women to become comfort women and with Burmese, Indonesia, Thai and Filipino women they made up a notable portion of Asian comfort women in general. Japanese use of Malaysian and Vietnamese women as comfort women was corroborated by testimonies. There were comfort women stations in Malaysia, Indonesia, Philippines, Burma, Thailand, Cambodia, Vietnam, North Korea and South Korea. A Korean comfort woman named Kim Ch'un-hui stayed behind in Vietnam and died there when she was 44 in 1963, owning a dairy farm, cafe, US cash and diamonds worth 200,000 US dollars. 1 million Vietnamese were starved to death during World War II according to Thomas U. Berger. 2 billion US dollars worth (1945 values) of damage, 148 million dollars of them due to destruction of industrial plants was incurred by Vietnam. 90% of heavy vehicles and motorcycles, cars and 16 tons of junks as well as railways, port installations were destroyed as well as one third of bridges. Some Japanese soldiers married Vietnamese women like Nguyen Thi Xuan and Nguyen Thi Thu and fathered multiple children with the Vietnamese women who remained behind in Vietnam while the Japanese soldiers themselves returned to Japan in 1955. The official Vietnamese historical narrative view them as children of rape and prostitution.

In the Vietnamese Famine of 1945 1 to 2 million Vietnamese starved to death in the Red river delta of northern Vietnam due to the Japanese, as the Japanese seized Vietnamese rice and didn't pay. In Phat Diem the Vietnamese farmer Di Ho was one of the few survivors who saw the Japanese steal grain. The North Vietnamese government accused both France and Japan of the famine and said 1-2 million Vietnamese died. Võ An Ninh took photographs of dead and dying Vietnamese during the great famine. Starving Vietnamese were dying throughout northern Vietnam in 1945 due to the Japanese seizure of their crops by the time the Chinese came to disarm the Japanese and Vietnamese corpses were all throughout the streets of Hanoi and had to be cleaned up by students.

On 25 March 2000, the Vietnamese journalist Trần Khuê wrote an article "Dân chủ: Vấn đề của dân tộc và thời đại" where he harshly criticized ethnographers and historians in Ho Chin Minh city's Institute of Social Sciences like Dr. Đinh Văn Liên and Professor Mạc Đường who tried to whitewash Japan's atrocities against the Vietnamese by portraying Japan's aid to the South Vietnamese regime against North Vietnam as humanitarian aid, portraying the Vietnam war against America as a civil war. changing the death toll of 2 million Vietnamese dead at the hands of the Japanese famine to 1 million and calling the Japanese invasion as a presence and calling Japanese fascists at simply Japanese at the Vietnam-Japan international conference. He accused them of changing history in exchange for only a few tens of thousands of dollars, and the Presidium of international Vietnamese studies in Hanoi did not include any Vietnamese women. The Vietnamese professor Văn Tạo and Japanese professor Furuta Moto both conducted a study in the field on the Japanese induced famine of 1945 admitting that Japan killed 2 million Vietnamese by starvation.

In March 1945, Japan launched the Second French Indochina Campaign to oust the Vichy French and formally installed Emperor Bảo Đại as head of the nominally "independent" Vietnam. The Japanese arrested and imprisoned most of the French officials and military officers remaining in the country.

American President Franklin D. Roosevelt and General Joseph Stilwell privately made it clear that France was not to reacquire French Indochina after the war was over. Roosevelt suggested that Chiang Kai-shek place Indochina under Chinese rule; Chiang Kai-shek supposedly replied: "Under no circumstances!" Following Roosevelt's death in April 1945, U.S. resistance to French rule weakened.

After the surrender of Japan

An armistice was signed between Japan and the United States on August 20, 1945. The Provisional Government of the French Republic wanted to restore its colonial rule in French Indochina as the final step of the Liberation of France.

On August 22, 1945, OSS agents Archimedes Patti and Carleton B. Swift Jr. arrived in Hanoi on a mercy mission to liberate Allied POWs, and were accompanied by French government official Jean Sainteny. The Imperial Japanese Army, being the only force capable of maintaining law and order, remained in power while keeping French colonial troops and Sainteny detained.

Japanese forces allowed the Việt Minh and other nationalist groups to take over public buildings and weapons without resistance, which began the August Revolution. On August 25, Hồ Chí Minh was able to persuade Emperor Bảo Đại to abdicate. Bảo Đại was appointed "supreme advisor" to the new Việt Minh-led government in Hanoi.

On September 2, aboard  in Tokyo Bay, CEFEO Expeditionary Corps leader General Leclerc signed the armistice with Japan on behalf of France. The same day, Hồ Chí Minh declared Vietnam's independence from France. Deliberately borrowing from the Declaration of Independence of the United States of America, Hồ Chí Minh proclaimed:

We hold the truth that all men are created equal, that they are endowed by their Creator with certain unalienable rights, among them life, liberty and the pursuit of happiness.

After their surrender, the Japanese Army gave weapons to the Việt Minh. In order to further help the nationalists, the Japanese kept Vichy French officials and military officers imprisoned for a month after the surrender. OSS officers met repeatedly with Hồ Chí Minh and other Việt Minh officers during this period. The Việt Minh recruited more than 600 Japanese soldiers and gave them roles to train or command Vietnamese soldiers.

On September 13, 1945, a Franco-British task force landed in Java, main island of the Dutch East Indies (for which independence was being sought by Sukarno), and Saigon, capital of Cochinchina (southern part of French Indochina), both being occupied by the Japanese and ruled by Field Marshal Hisaichi Terauchi, Commander-in-Chief of Japan's Southern Expeditionary Army Group based in Saigon. Allied troops in Saigon were an airborne detachment, two British companies of the Indian 20th Infantry Division and the French 5th Colonial Infantry Regiment, with British General Sir Douglas Gracey as supreme commander. The latter proclaimed martial law on September 21. The following night the Franco-British troops took control of Saigon.

Almost immediately afterward, as agreed to at the Potsdam Conference (and under Supreme Commander for the Allied Powers' "General Order no. One"), 200,000 troops of the Chinese 1st Army occupied Indochina as far south as the 16th parallel. They had been sent by Chiang Kai-shek under General Lu Han to accept the surrender of Japanese forces occupying that area, then to supervise the disarming and repatriation of the Japanese Army. This effectively ended Hồ Chí Minh's nominal government in Hanoi. Initially, the Chinese kept the French Colonial soldiers interned, with the acquiescence of the Americans. The Chinese used the VNQDĐ, the Vietnamese branch of the Chinese Kuomintang, to increase their influence in Indochina and put pressure on their opponents.

On October 9, 1945, General Leclerc arrived in Saigon, accompanied by French Colonel Massu's March Group (Groupement de marche). Leclerc's primary objectives were to restore public order in south Vietnam and to militarize Tonkin (north Vietnam). Secondary objectives were to wait for French backup in view to take back Chinese-occupied Hanoi, then to negotiate with the Việt Minh officials.

Chiang Kai-shek threatened the French with war in response to manoeuvering by the French and Hồ Chí Minh against each other, forcing them to come to a peace agreement. In February 1946, he also forced the French to surrender and renounce all of their concessions and ports in China, such as Shanghai, in exchange for withdrawing from northern Indochina and allowing French troops to reoccupy the region starting in March 1946. Following this agreement, VNQDĐ forces became vulnerable due to the withdrawal of Chinese forces and were attacked by Việt Minh and French troops. The Việt Minh massacred thousands of VNQDĐ members and other nationalists in a large-scale purge.

General Lu Han's 200,000 Chinese soldiers occupied north Vietnam starting August 1945. 90,000 arrived by October, the 62nd army came on 26 September to Nam Dinh and Haiphong. Lang Son and Cao Bang were occupied by the Guangxi 62nd army corps and the red river region and Lai Cai were occupied by a column from Yunnan. Vietnamese VNQDD fighters accompanied the Chinese soldiers. Ho Chi Minh ordered his DRV administration to set quotas for rice to give to the Chinese soldiers and rice was sold in Chinese currency in the red River delta. Lu Han occupied the French governor general's palace after ejecting the French staff under Sainteny. Chinese soldiers occupied northern Indochina north of the 16th parallel while the British under the South-East Asia Command of Lord Mountbatten occupied the south. Chiang Kai-shek deliberately withheld his crack and well trained soldiers from occupying Vietnam since he was going to use them to fight the Communists inside China and instead sent undisciplined warlord troops from Yunnan under Lu Han to occupy north Vietnam and Hanoi north of the 16th parallel to disarm and get Japanese troops to surrender. Ho Chi Minh confiscated gold taels, jewelry and coins in September 1945 during "Gold Week" to give to Chinese forces occupying northern Vietnam. Rice to Cochinchina by the French in October 1945 were divided by Ho Chi Minh, and the northern Vietnamese only received one third while the Chinese soldiers were given two thirds by Ho Chi Minh. For 15 days elections were postponed by Ho Chi Minh in response to a demand by Chinese general Chen Xiuhe on 18 December 1945 so that the Chinese could get the Dong Minh Hoi and VNQDD to prepare. The Chinese left only in April–June 1946. Ho Chi Minh gave golden smoking paraphernalia and a golden opium pipe to the Chinese general Lu Han after gold week and purchased weapons with what was left of the proceeds. Starving Vietnamese were dying throughout northern Vietnam in 1945 due to the Japanese seizure of their crops by the time the Chinese came to disarm the Japanese and Vietnamese corpses were all throughout the streets of Hanoi and had to be cleaned up by students. While Chiang Kai-shek, Xiao Wen (Hsiao Wen) and the Kuomintang central government of China was disinterested in occupying Vietnam beyond the allotted time period and involving itself in the war between the Viet Minh and the French, the Yunnan warlord Lu Han held the opposite view and wanted to occupy Vietnam to prevent the French returning and establish a Chinese trusteeship of Vietnam under the principles of the Atlantic Charter with the aim of eventually preparing Vietnam for independence and blocking the French from returning. Ho Chi Minh sent a cable on 17 October 1945 to American President Harry S. Truman calling on him, Generalissimo Chiang Kai-shek, Premier Stalin and Premier Attlee to go to the United Nations against France and demand France not be allowed to return to occupy Vietnam, accusing France of having sold out and cheated the Allies by surrendering Indochina to Japan and that France had no right to return. Ho Chi Minh dumped the blame on Dong Minh Hoi and VNDQQ for signing the agreement with France for returning its soldiers to Vietnam after he had to do it himself. Ho Chi Minh's Viet Minh tried to organize welcome parades for Chinese soldiers in northern Vietnam and covered for instances of bad behavior by warlord soldiers, trying to reassure Vietnamese that the warlord troops of Lu Han were only there temporarily and that China supported Vietnam's independence. Viet Minh newspapers said that the same ancestors (huyết thống) and culture were shared by Vietnamese and Chinese and that the Chinese heroically fought Japan and changed in the 1911 revolution and was attacked by western imperialists so it was "not the same as feudal China". Ho Chi Minh forbade his soldiers like Trần Huy Liệu in Phú Thọ from attacking Chinese soldiers and Ho Chi Minh even surrendered Vietnamese who attacked Chinese soldiers to be executed as punishment in the Ro-Nha incident in Kiến An district on 6 March 1946 after Hồ Đức Thành and Đào Văn Biểu, special commissioners sent from Hanoi by Ho's DRV examined the case. Ho Chi Minh appeased and granted numerous concessions to the Chinese soldiers to avoid the possibility of them clashing with the Viet Minh, with him ordering Vietnamese not to carry out anything against Chinese soldiers and pledging his life on his promise, hoping the Chinese would disarm the Japanese soldiers and finish their mission as fast as possible.

Chinese communist guerilla leader Chu Chia-pi came into northern Vietnam multiple times in 1945 and 1948 and helped the Viet Minh fight against the French from Yunnan. Other Chinese Communists also did the same.

Intra-Vietnamese factions
In addition to British support, the French also received assistance from various groups that modern historians consider unambiguously Vietnamese. Armed militias from the religious Hòa Hảo sect  and the Bình Xuyên organized crime group individually sought power in the country and fought the Việt Minh towards that end. Conversely, militias from the Cao Đài sect fought against the French.

Vietnamese society also polarized along ethnic lines: the Nung minority assisted the French, while the Tay assisted the Việt Minh.

Course of the war

War breaks out (1946) 

In early 1946, the French landed a military force at Haiphong, and negotiations took place about the future for Vietnam as a state within the French Union. Fighting broke out in Haiphong between the Việt Minh government and the French over a conflict of interest in import duty at the port. On November 23, 1946, the French fleet bombarded the Vietnamese sections of the city killing 6,000 Vietnamese civilians in one afternoon. The Việt Minh quickly agreed to a cease-fire and left the cities. This is known as the Haiphong incident.

There was never any intention among the Vietnamese to give up, as General Võ Nguyên Giáp soon brought up 30,000 men to attack the city. Although the French were outnumbered, their superior weaponry and naval support made any Việt Minh attack unsuccessful. In December, hostilities between the Việt Minh and the French broke out in Hanoi, and Hồ Chí Minh was forced to evacuate the capital in favor of remote forested and mountainous areas. Guerrilla warfare ensued, with the French controlling most of the country except far-flung areas. By January the following year, most provincial capitals had fallen to the French, while Hue fell in February after a six week siege.

French offensives, creation of the State of Vietnam (1947–1949) 

In 1947, General Võ Nguyên Giáp retreated with his command to Tan Trao deep in the mountains of Tuyên Quang Province. The French sent military expeditions to attack his bases, but Giap refused to meet them head-on in battle. Wherever the French troops went, the Việt Minh disappeared. Late in the year the French launched Operation Léa to take out the Việt Minh communications center at Bắc Kạn. They failed to capture Hồ Chí Minh and his key lieutenants as intended. The French claimed 9,000 Việt Minh soldiers KIA during the campaign which, if true, would represent a major blow for the insurgency.

In 1948, France started looking for means of opposing the Việt Minh politically, with an alternative government in Saigon. They began negotiations with the former emperor Bảo Đại to lead an "autonomous" government within the French Union of nations, the State of Vietnam. Two years before, the French had refused Ho's proposal of a similar status, albeit with some restrictions on French power and the latter's eventual withdrawal from Vietnam.

However, they were willing to give it to Bảo Đại as he had freely collaborated with French rule of Vietnam in the past and was in no position to seriously negotiate or impose demands.
In 1949, France officially recognized the nominal "independence" of the State of Vietnam as an associated state within the French Union under Bảo Đại. However, France still controlled all foreign relations and every defense issue. The Việt Minh quickly denounced the government and stated that they wanted "real independence, not Bảo Đại independence".
Within the framework of the French Union, France also granted independence to the other nations in Indochina, the Kingdoms of Laos and Cambodia.

Later, as a concession to the new government and a way to increase their numbers, France agreed to the formation of the Vietnamese National Army commanded by Vietnamese officers. These troops were used mostly to garrison quiet sectors, so French forces would be available for combat. Private armies from the Cao Đài and Hòa Hảo religious sects and the Bình Xuyên crime syndicate were used in the same way.

Việt Minh reorganization (1949–1950) 
With the triumph of the communists in China's civil war, the Vietnamese communists gained a major political ally on their northern border, supporting them with weapons and supplies. Giap re-organized his local irregular forces into five full conventional infantry divisions, the 304th, 308th, 312th, 316th and the 320th. The war began to intensify when Giap went on the offensive, attacking isolated French bases along the Chinese border.

The United States began to give military aid to France in the form of weaponry and military observers.

By January 1950, Ho's government gained recognition from China and the Soviet Union. In the same year, the government of Bảo Đại gained recognition by the United States and the United Kingdom.

In February, Giap seized the vulnerable 150-strong French garrison at Lai Khê in Tonkin just south of the border with China.

In June, the Korean War broke out between communist North Korea (DPRK) supported by China and the Soviet Union, and South Korea (ROK) supported by the United States and its allies in the UN. The Cold War was turning 'hot' in East Asia, and the American government feared communist domination of the entire region would have deep implications for American interests. The US became strongly opposed to the government of Hồ Chí Minh, in part, because it was supported and supplied by China.

Major General Thái attacked Đông Khê on September 15. Đông Khê fell on September 18.

The Cao Bằng garrison was then evacuated south and, together with the relief force coming from That Khe, were attacked all the way by ambushing Việt Minh forces, which resulted in a stunning French defeat in the Battle of Route Coloniale 4. The French air-dropped a paratroop battalion south of Cao Bằng to act as a diversion only to see it quickly surrounded and destroyed. After that, Lạng Sơn was evacuated in panic while it was not menaced.

By the time the remains of the garrisons reached the safety of the Red River Delta, 4,800 French troops had been killed, captured or missing in action and 2,000 wounded out of a total garrison force of over 10,000. Also lost were 13 artillery pieces, 125 mortars, 450 trucks, 940 machine guns, 1,200 submachine guns and 8,000 rifles destroyed or captured during the fighting. China and the Soviet Union recognized Hồ Chí Minh as the legitimate ruler of Vietnam and sent him more and more supplies and material aid. The year 1950 also marked the first time that napalm was ever used in Vietnam (this type of weapon was supplied by the U.S. for the use of the French Aéronavale).

Renewed French success (January–June 1951) 
The military situation improved for France when its new commander, General Jean Marie de Lattre de Tassigny, built a fortified line from Hanoi to the Gulf of Tonkin, across the Red River Delta, to hold the Việt Minh in place and use his troops to smash them against this barricade, which became known as the De Lattre Line. This led to a period of success for the French.

The Việt Minh entered a trap. Caught for the first time in the open and actually forced to fight the French head-on, without the ability to quickly hide and retreat, they were heavily attacked by concentrated French artillery and machine gun fire. By January 16, the Battle of Vĩnh Yên ended as Giáp was forced to withdraw, with over 6,000 of his troops killed, 8,000 wounded and 500 captured.

The 316th Division, composed of 11,000 men, with the partly rebuilt 308th and 312th Divisions in reserve, went forward and were beaten in bitter hand-to-hand fighting against French troops. Giap withdrew, having lost around 500 troops (by Việt Minh estimation) to over 3,000 (by French estimation) dead and wounded by March 28.

Giáp launched yet another attack, the Battle of the Day River, on May 29 with the 304th Division at Phủ Lý, the 308th Division at Ninh Bình, and the main attack delivered by the 320th Division at Phát Diệm south of Hanoi. The attacks fared no better and the three divisions lost heavily. Taking advantage of this, de Lattre mounted his counteroffensive against the demoralized Việt Minh, driving them back into the forests and eliminating the enemy pockets in the Red River Delta by June 18, costing the Việt Minh over 10,000 killed.

Every effort by Võ Nguyên Giáp to break the De Lattre Line failed, and every attack he made was answered by a French counter-attack that destroyed his forces. Việt Minh casualties rose alarmingly during this period, leading some to question the leadership of the Communist government, even within the party. However, any benefit this may have reaped for France was negated by the increasing domestic opposition to the war in France.

Stalemate (July 1951–1953) 
On July 31, French General Charles Chanson was assassinated during a propaganda suicide attack at Sa Đéc in South Vietnam that was blamed on the Việt Minh although it was argued in some quarters that Cao Đài nationalist Trình Minh Thế could have been involved in its planning.

In January, General de Lattre fell ill from cancer and returned to France for treatment. He died there shortly thereafter and was replaced by General Raoul Salan as the overall commander of French forces in Indochina. The Việt Minh launched attacks on Hòa Bình, forcing the French to withdraw back to their main positions on the De Lattre Line by February 22, 1952. Each side lost nearly 5,000 men in this campaign, and it showed that the war was far from over.

Throughout the war theater, the Việt Minh cut French supply lines and wore down the resolve of the French forces. There were continued raids, skirmishes and guerrilla attacks, but through most of the rest of the year each side withdrew to prepare for larger operations. In the Battle of Nà Sản, starting on October 2, French commanders began using "hedgehog" tactics, consisting in setting up well-defended outposts to get the Việt Minh out of the forests and force them to fight conventional battles instead of using guerrilla tactics.

On October 17, 1952, Giáp launched attacks against the French garrisons along Nghĩa Lộ, northwest of Hanoi, and overran much of the Black River valley, except for the airfield of Nà Sản where a strong French garrison entrenched. Giáp by now had control over most of Tonkin beyond the De Lattre Line. Raoul Salan, seeing the situation as critical, launched Operation Lorraine along the Clear River to force Giáp to relieve pressure on the Nghĩa Lộ outposts.

On October 29, 1952, in the largest operation in Indochina to date, 30,000 French Union soldiers moved out from the De Lattre Line to attack the Việt Minh supply dumps at Phú Yên. Salan took Phú Thọ on November 5, and Phu Doan on November 9 by a parachute drop, and finally Phú Yên on November 13. Giáp at first did not react to the French offensive. He planned to wait until their supply lines were overextended and then cut them off from the Red River Delta.

Salan correctly guessed what the Việt Minh were up to and cancelled the operation on November 14, beginning to withdraw back to the De Lattre Line. The only major fighting during the operation came during the withdrawal, when the Việt Minh ambushed the French column at Chan Muong on November 17. The road was cleared after a bayonet charge by the Indochinese March Battalion, and the withdrawal could continue. The French lost around 1,200 men during the whole operation, most of them during the Chan Muong ambush. The operation was partially successful, proving that the French could strike out at targets outside the De Lattre Line. However, it failed to divert the Việt Minh offensive or seriously damage its logistical network.

On April 9, 1953, Giáp, after having failed repeatedly in direct attacks on French positions in Vietnam, changed strategy and began to pressure the French by invading Laos, surrounding and defeating several French outposts such as Muong Khoua. In May, General Henri Navarre replaced Salan as supreme commander of French forces in Indochina. He reported to the French government "... that there was no possibility of winning the war in Indo-China", saying that the best the French could hope for was a stalemate.

Navarre, in response to the Việt Minh attacking Laos, concluded that "hedgehog" centers of defense were the best plan.

Operation Castor was launched on November 20, 1953, with 1,800 men of the French 1st and 2nd Airborne Battalions dropping into the valley of Điện Biên Phủ and sweeping aside the local Việt Minh garrison. Encountering little opposition, the French and Tai units operating from Lai Châu to the north patrolled the mountains.

The operation was a tactical success for the French. However, Giáp, seeing the weakness of the French position, started moving most of his forces from the De Lattre Line to Điện Biên Phủ. By mid-December, most of the French and Tai patrols in the mountains around the town were wiped out by Việt Minh ambushes. The fight for control of this position would be the longest and hardest battle for the French Far East Expeditionary Corps and would be remembered by the veterans as "57 Days of Hell".

French defeat at Dien Bien Phu, end of the war (1954) 

By 1954, despite official propaganda presenting the war as a "crusade against communism", the war in Indochina was still growing unpopular with the French public. The political stagnation in the Fourth Republic meant that France was unable to extract itself from the conflict.

The Battle of Dien Bien Phu took place in 1954 between Việt Minh forces under Võ Nguyên Giáp, supported by China and the Soviet Union, and the French Union's French Far East Expeditionary Corps, supported by US financing and Indochinese allies. The battle was fought near the village of Điện Biên Phủ in northern Vietnam and became the last major battle between the French and the Vietnamese in the First Indochina War.

The battle began on March 13 when a preemptive Việt Minh attack surprised the French with heavy artillery. The artillery damaged both the main and secondary airfields that the French were using to fly in supplies. The only road into Điện Biên Phủ, already difficult to traverse, was also knocked out by Việt Minh forces. With French supply lines interrupted, the French position became untenable, particularly when the advent of the monsoon season made dropping supplies and reinforcements by parachute difficult. With defeat imminent, the French sought to hold on until the opening of the Geneva peace meeting on April 26. The last French offensive took place on May 4, but it was ineffective. The Việt Minh then began to hammer the outpost with newly supplied Soviet Katyusha rockets and other weaponry provided by communist allies.

The final fall took two days, May 6 and 7, during which the French fought on but were eventually overrun by a huge frontal assault. General Cogny, based in Hanoi, ordered General de Castries, who was commanding the outpost, to cease fire at 5:30 pm and to destroy all materiél (weapons, transmissions, etc.) to deny their use to the enemy. A formal order was given to not use the white flag so that the action would be considered a ceasefire instead of a surrender. Much of the fighting ended on May 7; however, the ceasefire was not respected on Isabelle, the isolated southern position, where the battle lasted until May 8, 1:00 am.

At least 2,200 members of the 20,000-strong French forces died, and another 1,729 were reported missing after the battle, and 11,721 were captured. The Viet Minh suffered approximately 25,000 casualties over the course of the battle, with as many as 10,000 Viet Minh personnel having been killed in the battle. Such a high amount of losses has led some historians to classify the Viet Minh's triumph as a pyrrhic victory and has been attributed as a factor motivating the Viet Minh's leadership to enter peace negotiations with France shortly thereafter. The prisoners taken at Điện Biên Phủ were the greatest number the Việt Minh had ever captured: one-third of the total captured during the entire war.

One month after Điện Biên Phủ, the composite Groupe Mobile 100 (GM100) of the French Union forces evacuated the An Khê outpost and was ambushed by a larger Việt Minh force at the Battle of Mang Yang Pass from June 24 to July 17. At the same time, Giap launched some offensives against the delta, but they all failed. The Việt Minh victory at Điện Biên Phủ heavily influenced the outcome of the 1954 Geneva accords that took place on July 21. In August Operation Passage to Freedom began, consisting of the evacuation of Catholic and other Vietnamese civilians from communist North Vietnamese persecution.

Geneva Conference and Partition

The Geneva Conference on July 21, 1954, recognized the 17th parallel north as a "provisional military demarcation line", temporarily dividing the country into two zones, communist North Vietnam and pro-Western South Vietnam.

Negotiations between France and the Việt Minh started in Geneva in April 1954 at the Geneva Conference, during which time the French Union and the Việt Minh were fighting a battle at Điện Biên Phủ. In France, Pierre Mendès France, opponent of the war since 1950, had been invested as Prime Minister on June 17, 1954, on a promise to put an end to the war, reaching a ceasefire in four months:

Today it seems we can be reunited in a will for peace that may express the aspirations of our country ... Since already several years, a compromise peace, a peace negotiated with the opponent seemed to me commanded by the facts, while it commanded, in return, to put back in order our finances, the recovery of our economy and its expansion. Because this war placed on our country an unbearable burden. And here appears today a new and formidable threat: if the Indochina conflict is not resolved — and settled very fast — it is the risk of war, of international war and maybe atomic, that we must foresee. It is because I wanted a better peace that I wanted it earlier, when we had more assets. But even now there is some renouncings or abandons that the situation does not comprise. France does not have to accept and will not accept settlement which would be incompatible with its more vital interests [applauding on certain seats of the Assembly on the left and at the extreme right]. France will remain present in Far-Orient. Neither our allies, nor our opponents must conserve the least doubt on the signification of our determination. A negotiation has been engaged in Geneva ... I have longly studied the report ... consulted the most qualified military and diplomatic experts. My conviction that a pacific settlement of the conflict is possible has been confirmed. A "cease-fire" must henceforth intervene quickly. The government which I will form will fix itself — and will fix to its opponents — a delay of 4 weeks to reach it. We are today on 17th of June. I will present myself before you before the 20th of July ... If no satisfying solution has been reached at this date, you will be freed from the contract which would have tied us together, and my government will give its dismissal to the President of the Republic. 

The Geneva Accords promised elections in 1956 to determine a national government for a united Vietnam. Neither the United States government nor Ngô Đình Diệm's State of Vietnam signed anything at the 1954 Geneva Conference. With respect to the question of reunification, the non-communist Vietnamese delegation objected strenuously to any division of Vietnam, but lost out when the French accepted the proposal of Việt Minh delegate Phạm Văn Đồng, who proposed that Vietnam eventually be united by elections under the supervision of "local commissions". The United States countered with what became known as the "American Plan", with the support of South Vietnam and the United Kingdom. It provided for unification elections under the supervision of the United Nations, but was rejected by the Soviet delegation. From his home in France, Bảo Đại appointed Ngô Đình Diệm as Prime Minister of South Vietnam. With American support, in 1955 Diem used a referendum to remove the former Emperor and declare himself the president of the Republic of Vietnam.

When the elections failed to occur, Việt Minh cadres who stayed behind in South Vietnam were activated and started to fight the government. North Vietnam also invaded and occupied portions of Laos to assist in supplying the National Liberation Front guerrillas fighting in South Vietnam. The war gradually escalated into the Second Indochina War, more commonly known as the Vietnam War in the West and the American War in Vietnam.

French domestic situation
The 1946 Constitution creating the Fourth Republic (1946–1958) made France a parliamentary republic. Because of the political context, it could find stability only by an alliance between the three dominant
parties: the Christian Democratic Popular Republican Movement (MRP), the French Communist Party (PCF) and the socialist French Section of the Workers' International (SFIO). Known as tripartisme, this alliance briefly lasted until the May 1947 crisis, with the expulsion from Paul Ramadier's SFIO government of the PCF ministers, marking the official start of the Cold War in France. This had the effect of weakening the regime, with the two most significant movements of this period, Communism and Gaullism, in opposition.

Unlikely alliances had to be made between left- and right-wing parties in order to form a government invested by the National Assembly, resulting in parliamentary instability, with 14 prime ministers in succession between 1947 and 1954's Battle of Dien Bien Phu. The rapid turnover of governments (there were 17 different governments during the war) left France unable to prosecute the war with any consistent policy, according to veteran General René de Biré (who was a lieutenant at Dien Bien Phu). France was increasingly unable to afford the costly conflict in Indochina and, by 1954, the United States was paying 80% of France's war effort, which was $3,000,000 per day in 1952.

A strong anti-war movement came into existence in France driven mostly by the powerful French Communist Party (outpowering the socialists) and its young militant associations, major trade unions such as the General Confederation of Labour, and notable leftist intellectuals. The first occurrence was probably at the National Assembly on March 21, 1947, when the communist deputies refused to back the military credits for Indochina. The following year a pacifist event was organized, the "1st Worldwide Congress of Peace Partisans" (1er Congrès Mondial des Partisans de la Paix, the World Peace Council's predecessor), which took place March 25–28, 1948, in Paris, with the French communist Nobel laureate atomic physicist Frédéric Joliot-Curie as president. Later, on April 28, 1950, Joliot-Curie would be dismissed from the military and civilian Atomic Energy Commission for political reasons.

Young communist militants (UJRF) were also accused of sabotage actions like the famous Henri Martin affair and the case of Raymonde Dien, who was jailed one year for having blocked an ammunition train, with the help of other militants, in order to prevent the supply of French forces in Indochina in February 1950. Similar actions against trains occurred in Roanne, Charleville, Marseille, and Paris. Even ammunition sabotage by PCF agents has been reported, such as grenades exploding in the hands of legionaries. These actions became such a cause for concern by 1950 that the French Assembly voted a law against sabotage between March 2–8. At this session tension was so high between politicians that fighting ensued in the assembly following communist deputies' speeches against the Indochinese policy. This month saw the French navy mariner and communist militant Henri Martin arrested by military police and jailed for five years for sabotage and propaganda operations in Toulon's arsenal. On May 5 communist Ministers were dismissed from the government, marking the end of Tripartism. A few months later on November 11, 1950, the French Communist Party leader Maurice Thorez went to Moscow.

Some military officers involved in the Revers Report scandal (Rapport Revers) such as Salan were pessimistic about the way the war was being conducted, with multiple political-military scandals all happening during the war, starting with the Generals' Affair (Affaire des Généraux) from September 1949 to November 1950. As a result, General Georges Revers was dismissed in December 1949 and socialist Defense Ministry Jules Moch (SFIO) was brought on court by the National Assembly on November 28, 1950. Emerging media played their role. The scandal started the commercial success of the first French news magazine, L'Express, created in 1953. The third scandal was financial-political, concerning military corruption, money and arms trading involving both the French Union army and the Việt Minh, known as the Piastres affair. The war ended in 1954 but its sequel started in French Algeria where the French Communist Party played an even stronger role by supplying the National Liberation Front (FLN) rebels with intelligence documents and financial aid. They were called "the suitcase carriers" (les porteurs de valises).

In the French news, the Indochina War was presented as a direct continuation of the Korean War, where France had fought: a UN French battalion, incorporated in a U.S. unit in Korea, was later involved in the Battle of Mang Yang Pass of June and July 1954. In an interview taped in May 2004, General Marcel Bigeard (6th BPC) argues that "one of the deepest mistakes done by the French during the war was the propaganda telling you are fighting for Freedom, you are fighting against Communism", hence the sacrifice of volunteers during the climactic battle of Dien Bien Phu. In the latest days of the siege, 652 non-paratrooper soldiers from all army corps from cavalry to infantry to artillery dropped for the first and last time of their life to support their comrades. The Cold War excuse was later used by General Maurice Challe through his famous "Do you want Mers El Kébir and Algiers to become Soviet bases as soon as tomorrow?", during the Generals' putsch (Algerian War) of 1961, with limited effect though.

A few hours after the French Union defeat at Dien Bien Phu in May 1954, United States Secretary of State John Foster Dulles made an official speech depicting the "tragic event" and "its defense for fifty seven days and nights will remain in History as one of the most heroic of all time." Later on, he denounced Chinese aid to the Việt Minh, explained that the United States could not act openly because of international pressure, and concluded with the call to "all concerned nations" concerning the necessity of "a collective defense" against "the communist aggression".

The Viet Minh victory in the war had an inspirational effect to independence movements in various French colonies worldwide, most notably the FLN in Algeria. The Algerian War broke out on 1 November 1954, only six months after the Geneva Conference. Benyoucef Benkhedda, later became the head of the Provisional Government of the Algerian Republic, praised the Viet Minh feat at Dien Bien Phu as "a powerful incentive to all who thought immediate insurrection the only possible strategy".

War crimes and re-education camps 

According to Arthur J. Dommen, the Việt Minh assassinated 100,000–150,000 civilians during the war out of a total civilian death toll of 400,000. Benjamin Valentino estimates that the French were responsible for 60,000 to 250,000 civilian deaths.

During the war, there were many instances of war rapes against Vietnamese civilians by French soldiers. This occurred in Saigon, alongside robberies and killings, following the return of the French in August 1945. Vietnamese women were also raped by French soldiers in northern Vietnam in 1948, following the defeat of the Viet Minh, including in Bảo Hà, Bảo Yên District, Lào Cai province and Phu Lu This led to 400 French trained Vietnamese defecting to the Viet Minh June 1948. French killings of Vietnamese civilians were reported, many of them were caused by the tendency of Viet Minh troops to hide among civilian settlements. One of the largest massacres by French troops was the Mỹ Trạch massacre of November 29, 1947, in which French soldiers killed over 200 women and children. Regarding this massacre and other war crimes during the conflict, Christopher Goscha wrote in The Penguin History of Modern Vietnam:Viet Minh militants employed terrorist attacks throughout the conflict as a systematic practice, often targeting European and Eurasian civilians. In 1947  wounded soldiers and French civilians who had returned to France from Vietnam reported that Vietnamese "suicide squads" had tortured and massacred French civilians. The Canberra Times reported that "The men were soaked with petrol and set afire. The women were killed after they were raped, and children were hacked to pieces." The witnesses also asserted that they had seen Japanese soldiers among the Viet Minh. One of the worst attacks on Europeans was on 21 July 1952, when Viet Minh militants, using grenades, Sten guns, and machetes, massacred twenty unarmed people at a military hospital in Cap St. Jacques- eight officers on sick leave, six children, four Vietnamese servants, and two women.

The French Army also utilized torture against Việt Minh prisoners. The use of torture was not one-sided; many French Union and Vietnamese National Army prisoners died in the Việt Minh POW camps. In the Boudarel Affair, French Communist militant Georges Boudarel was discovered to have used brainwashing and torture against French Union POWs in Việt Minh reeducation camps. The French national association of POWs brought Boudarel to court for a war crime charge.

Passage to Freedom was a Franco-American operation to evacuate refugees. Loyal Indochinese evacuated to metropolitan France were kept in detention camps.

In 1957, the French Chief of Staff with Raoul Salan would use the POWs' experience with the Việt Minh reeducation camps to create two "Instruction Center for Pacification and Counter-Insurgency" (Centre d'Instruction à la Pacification et à la Contre-Guérilla aka CIPCG) and train thousands of officers during the Algerian War.

French Union involvement

By 1946, France headed the French Union. As successive governments had forbidden the sending of metropolitan troops, the French Far East Expeditionary Corps (CEFEO) was created in March 1945. The Union gathered combatants from almost all French territories made of colonies, protectorates and associated states (Algeria, Morocco, Madagascar, Senegal, Tunisia, etc.) to fight in French Indochina, which was then occupied by the Japanese. About 325,000 of the 500,000 French troops were Indochinese, almost all of whom were used in conventional units.

French West Africa (Afrique Occidentale Française, AOF) was a federation of African colonies. Senegalese and other African troops were sent to fight in Indochina. Some African alumni were trained in the Infantry Instruction Center no.2 (Centre d'Instruction de l'Infanterie no.2) located in southern Vietnam. Senegalese of the Colonial Artillery fought at the siege of Dien Bien Phu. As a French colony (later a full province), French Algeria sent local troops to Indochina including several RTA (Régiment de Tirailleurs Algériens) light infantry battalions. Morocco was a French protectorate and sent troops to support the French effort in Indochina. Moroccan troops were part of light infantry RTMs (Régiment de Tirailleurs Marocains) for the "Moroccan Sharpshooters Regiment".

As a French protectorate, Bizerte, Tunisia, was a major French base. Tunisian troops, mostly RTT (Régiment de Tirailleurs Tunisiens), were sent to Indochina. Part of French Indochina, then part of the French Union and later an associated state, Laos fought the communists along with French forces. The role played by Laotian troops in the conflict was depicted by veteran Pierre Schoendoerffer's famous 317th Platoon released in 1964. The French Indochina state of Cambodia played a significant role during the Indochina War through its infantrymen and paratroopers.

While Bảo Đại's State of Vietnam (formerly Annam, Tonkin, Cochinchina) had the Vietnamese National Army supporting the French forces, some minorities were trained and organized as regular battalions (mostly infantry tirailleurs) that fought with French forces against the Việt Minh. The Tai Battalion 2 (BT2, 2e Bataillon Thai) is infamous for its desertion during the siege of Dien Bien Phu. Propaganda leaflets written in Tai and French sent by the Việt Minh were found in the deserted positions and trenches. Such deserters were called the Nam Yum rats by Bigeard during the siege, as they hid close to the Nam Yum river during the day and searched at night for supply drops. Another allied minority was the Muong people (Mường). The 1st Muong Battalion (1er Bataillon Muong) was awarded the Croix de guerre des théâtres d'opérations extérieures after the victorious Battle of Vĩnh Yên in 1951.

In the 1950s, the French established secret commando groups based on loyal Montagnard ethnic minorities referred to as "partisans" or "maquisards", called the Groupement de Commandos Mixtes Aéroportés (Composite Airborne Commando Group or GCMA), later renamed Groupement Mixte d'Intervention (GMI, or Mixed Intervention Group), directed by the SDECE counter-intelligence service. The SDECE's "Service Action" GCMA used both commando and guerrilla techniques and operated in intelligence and secret missions from 1950 to 1955. Declassified information about the GCMA includes the name of its commander, famous Colonel Roger Trinquier, and a mission on April 30, 1954, when Jedburgh veteran Captain Sassi led the Meo partisans of the GCMA Malo-Servan in Operation Condor during the siege of Dien Bien Phu.

In 1951, Adjutant-Chief Vandenberghe from the 6th Colonial Infantry Regiment (6e RIC) created the "Commando Vanden" (aka "Black Tigers", aka "North Vietnam Commando #24") based in Nam Định. Recruits were volunteers from the Thổ people, Nùng people and Miao people. This commando unit wore Việt Minh black uniforms to confuse the enemy and used techniques of the experienced Bo doi (Bộ đội, regular army) and Du Kich (guerrilla unit). Việt Minh prisoners were recruited in POW camps. The commando was awarded the Croix de Guerre des TOE with palm in July 1951; however, Vandenberghe was betrayed by a Việt Minh recruit, commander Nguien Tinh Khoi (308th Division's 56th Regiment), who assassinated him (and his Vietnamese fiancée) with external help on the night of January 5, 1952. Coolies and POWs known as PIM (Prisonniers Internés Militaires, which is basically the same as POW) were civilians used by the army as logistical support personnel. During the battle of Dien Bien Phu, coolies were in charge of burying the corpses—during the first days only, after they were abandoned, hence giving off a terrible smell, according to veterans—and they had the dangerous job of gathering supply packets delivered in drop zones while the Việt Minh artillery was firing hard to destroy the crates. The Việt Minh also used thousands of coolies to carry the Chu-Luc (regional units) supplies and ammunition during assaults. The PIM were civilian males old enough to join Bảo Đại's army. They were captured in enemy-controlled villages, and those who refused to join the State of Vietnam's army were considered prisoners or used as coolies to support a given regiment.

Foreign involvement

Japanese volunteers
Many former Imperial Japanese Army soldiers fought alongside the Việt Minh—perhaps as many as 5,000 volunteered their services throughout the war. These Japanese had stayed behind in Indochina after World War II concluded in 1945. The occupying British authorities then repatriated most of the rest of the 50,000 Japanese troops back to Japan. For those that stayed behind, supporting the Việt Minh became a more attractive idea than returning to a defeated and occupied homeland. In addition the Việt Minh had very little experience, in warfare or government so the advice of the Japanese was welcome. Some of the Japanese were ex-Kenpeitai who were wanted for questioning by Allied authorities. Giap arranged for them all to receive Vietnamese citizenship and false identification papers. Some Japanese were captured by the Việt Minh during the last months of the World War II and were recruited into their ranks.

Most of the Japanese officers who stayed served as military instructors for the Việt Minh forces, most notably at the Quảng Ngãi Army Academy. They imparted necessary conventional military knowledge - such as how to conduct assaults, night attacks, company/battalion level exercises, commanding, tactics, navigation, communications and movements. A few, however, actively led Vietnamese forces into combat. The French also identified eleven Japanese nurses and two doctors working for the Việt Minh in northern Vietnam in 1951. The Yasukuni Shrine commemorates a number of Japanese involved in the First Indochina War.

Notable Japanese officers serving in Việt Minh included:
 Colonel Mukaiyama - reportedly a staff officer in the 38th Army, who became a technical advisor to the Vietnamese. Credited as the leader of Japanese forces in Vietnam; killed in combat in 1946.
 Colonel Masanobu Tsuji - Operations Staff Officer.
  - a staff officer in the 55th Division who had commanded a squadron of its cavalry regiment. Supposedly the youngest major in the Imperial Army at the time, he led a number of volunteers to the Vietnamese cause, becoming a colonel and military advisor to General Nguyễn Sơn. He headed the Quảng Ngãi Military Academy for a while before founding the Tuy Hòa Military Academy, and was killed by a land mine in 1950.
 Major Kanetoshi Toshihide - served with Major Igari in the 2nd Division and followed him to join the Việt Minh; he became Chief of Staff for General Nguyễn Giác Ngộ.
  - a staff officer in the 34th Independent Mixed Brigade; he joined the Viet Minh forces, and was killed in action against the French in 1946. He allegedly conceived the idea of establishing the Quảng Ngãi Military Academy.
 Lieutenant Igari Kazumasa - the commander of an infantry company in the 2nd Division's 29th Infantry Regiment; he became an instructor at the Quảng Ngãi Military Academy.
 Lieutenant Kamo Tokuji - a platoon leader under Lieutenant Igari; he also became an instructor at the Quảng Ngãi Military Academy.
  an intelligence officer who was originally supposed to remain behind in Indonesia, but linked up with the 34th Brigade to try to get home, only to end up as an instructor at the Quảng Ngãi Military Academy until 1954.
 2nd Lieutenant Nakahara Mitsunobu -  an intelligence officer of the 34th Independent Mixed Brigade; became a decorated soldier in the Việt Minh forces, and later an instructor at the Quảng Ngãi Military Academy.

China

One point that the French had a major problem with was the concept of "sanctuary". So long as the anti-colonial revolutionaries who are fighting a guerrilla war have a sanctuary, in which they can hide out, rest and recuperate after losses and store supplies and necessary material, it is almost impossible and highly unlikely for any foreign enemy or foe to ever destroy and defeat them. During the early 1950s guerrilla troops used the southern areas of China, by then under the rule of Chinese communists allied with the anti-French Việt Minh, as a sanctuary. The Việt Minh successfully carried out several hit-and-run ambushes against French Union military convoys along the neighboring Route Coloniale 4 (RC 4) roadway, which was a major supply passage in Tonkin (northern Vietnam). One of the most famous attacks of this nature was the Battle of Cao Bằng of 1947–1949.

China supplied and provided the Việt Minh guerrilla forces with almost every kind of crucial and important supplies and material required, such as food (including thousands of tonnes of rice), money, medics and medical aid and supplies, arms and weapons (ranging from artillery guns (24 of such were used at the Battle of Dien Bien Phu) to rifles and machine-guns), ammunition and explosives and other types of military equipment, including a large part of war-material captured from the then-recently defeated National Revolutionary Army (NRA) of Chiang Kai-shek's Nationalist Chinese government following the end of the Chinese Civil War in 1949. Evidence of the PRC's secret aid and supplies were found hidden in caves during the French military's Operation Hirondelle in July 1953. 2,000 military advisors from the PRC and the Soviet Union trained the Việt Minh guerrilla force with the aim of turning it into a full-fledged armed force to fight off their French colonial masters and gain national independence. On top of this, the PRC sent two People's Liberation Army (PLA) artillery battalions to fight at the siege of Dien Bien Phu on May 6, 1954, with one battalion operating the Soviet Katyusha multiple-rocket launcher systems (MRLS) against French forces besieged at Dien Bien Phu's valley.

From 1950 to 1954 the Chinese government shipped goods, materials, and medicine worth $ billion (in  dollars) to Vietnam. From 1950 to 1956 the Chinese government shipped 155,000 small arms, 58 million rounds of ammunition, 4,630 artillery pieces, 1,080,000 artillery shells, 840,000 hand grenades, 1,400,000 uniforms, 1,200 vehicles, 14,000 tons of food, and 26,000 tons of fuel to Vietnam. Mao Zedong considered it necessary to buttress the Viet Minh to secure his country's southern flank against potential interference by westerners, while the bulk of the PRC's regular military forces participated in the Korean War from 1950 to 1953. After the end of the Korean War and the resolution of the First Taiwan Strait Crisis, China stepped up involvement in the Indochina Wars, viewing the presence of potentially hostile forces in Indochina as the main threat.

Soviet Union
The Soviet Union was the other major ally of the Việt Minh, alongside the PRC. Moscow supplied GAZ-built trucks, truck engines and motor-parts, fuel, tyres, many different kinds of arms and weapons (including thousands of Škoda-manufactured light machine-guns of Czech origin), all kinds of ammunition (ranging from rifle to machine-gun ammunition), various types of anti-aircraft guns (such as the 37mm air-defense gun) and even cigarettes and tobacco products. During Operation Hirondelle, French Union paratroopers captured and destroyed many tonnes of Soviet-supplied material destined for Việt Minh use in the area of Ky Lua. According to General Giap, the chief military leader of all Việt Minh forces, the Việt Minh used about 400 Soviet-produced GAZ-51 trucks at the Battle of Dien Bien Phu. Because the trucks were concealed and hidden with the use of highly effective camouflage (comprised predominantly of thick vegetation), French Union reconnaissance aircraft were not able to notice them and take note of the effective Việt Minh supply-train. On May 6, 1954, during the siege against French forces at the valley of Dien Bien Phu, Soviet-supplied Katyusha MLRS were successfully fielded against French Union military outposts, destroying enemy troop formations and bases and lowering their morale levels. Together with the PRC, the Soviet Union sent up to 2,000 military advisors to provide training to the Việt Minh guerrilla troops and to turn it into a conventional army.

United States

Mutual Defense Assistance Act (1950–1954)

At the beginning of the war, the U.S. was neutral in the conflict because of its opposition to European colonialism, because the Việt Minh had recently been U.S. allies, and because most of its attention was focused on Europe where Winston Churchill argued an Iron Curtain had fallen.

Then the U.S. government gradually began supporting the French in their war effort, primarily through the Mutual Defense Assistance Act, as a means of stabilizing the French Fourth Republic in which the French Communist Party was a significant political force. A dramatic shift occurred in American policy after the 1949 victory of Mao Zedong's Chinese Communist Party in the Chinese Civil War. By 1949 the United States became concerned about the spread of communism in Asia, particularly following the end of the Chinese Civil War, and began to strongly support the French as the two countries were bound by the Cold War Mutual Defense Programme.

After the Moch–Marshall meeting of September 23, 1950, in Washington, the United States started to support the French Union effort politically, logistically and financially. Officially, US involvement did not include use of armed force. However, recently declassified US documents have revealed that undercover (CAT)—or not—US Air Force pilots flew to support the French during Operation Castor in November 1953. Two US pilots were killed in action during the siege at Dien Bien Phu the following year. These facts were declassified and made public more than 50 years after the events, in 2005 during the Légion d'honneur award ceremony by the French ambassador in Washington.

In May 1950, after Chinese communist forces occupied Hainan island, U.S. President Harry S. Truman began covertly authorizing direct financial assistance to the French, and on June 27, 1950, after the outbreak of the Korean War, announced publicly that the U.S. was doing so. It was feared in Washington that if Ho were to win the war, with his ties to the Soviet Union, he would establish a puppet state of Moscow, with the Soviets ultimately controlling Vietnamese affairs. The prospect of a communist-dominated Southeast Asia spurred the U.S. to support France, with a view to containing the spread of Soviet-allied communism.

On June 30, 1950, the first U.S. supplies for Indochina were delivered. In September, Truman sent the Military Assistance Advisory Group (MAAG) to Indochina to assist the French. Later, in 1954, U.S. President Dwight D. Eisenhower explained the escalation risk, introducing what he referred to as the "domino principle", which eventually became the concept of domino theory. During the Korean War, the conflict in Vietnam was also seen as part of a broader proxy war with China and the USSR in Asia.

As the situation at Dien Bien Phu deteriorated in 1954, France requested more support from the United States, including equipment and direct intervention. For instance, on April 4 French Prime Minister Joseph Laniel and Foreign Minister Georges Bidault conveyed to U.S. Ambassador C. Douglas Dillon that "immediate armed intervention of US carrier aircraft at DienBien Phu is now necessary to save the situation". The United States discussed with allies multiple options, including the use of nuclear weapons. A key concern in the planning was the response of China. While the planning continued, the United States moved an aircraft-carrier task-force, which included the carriers Boxer and Essex, into the South China Sea between the Philippines and Indochina. However, the leadership of the United States eventually decided that there was not sufficient international or domestic support for the United States to become directly involved in the conflict.

US Navy assistance (1951–1954)

 delivered Grumman F8F Bearcat fighter aircraft to Saigon on January 26, 1951.

On March 2, 1951, the United States Navy transferred  (LST 490) to the French Navy in Indochina in accordance with the MAAG-led MAP. Renamed RFS Vulcain (A-656), she was used in Operation Hirondelle in 1953.  carrier delivered Grumman F8F Bearcat aircraft to Saigon on March 26, 1951. She was used to support delta defenders in the Hạ Long Bay operation in May 1954. In August she joined the Franco-American evacuation operation called "Passage to Freedom".

The same month, the United States delivered additional aircraft, again using USS Windham Bay. On April 18, 1954, during the siege of Dien Bien Phu,  delivered 25 Korean War AU-1 Corsair aircraft for use by the French Aeronavale in supporting the besieged garrison.

US Air Force assistance (1952–1954)

A total of 94 F4U-7s were built for the Aéronavale in 1952, with the last of the batch, the final Corsair built, rolled out in December 1952. The F4U-7s were actually purchased by the U.S. Navy and passed on to the Aéronavale through the U.S. Military Assistance Program (MAP). They were supplemented by 25 ex-U.S.MC AU-1s (previously used in the Korean War) and moved from Yokosuka, Japan, to Tourane Air Base (Da Nang), Vietnam, in April 1952. US Air Force assistance followed in November 1953 when the French commander in Indochina, General Henri Navarre, asked General Chester E. McCarty, commander of the Combat Cargo Division, for 12 Fairchild C-119s for Operation Castor at Dien Bien Phu. The USAF also provided C-124 Globemasters to transport French paratroop reinforcements to Indochina.

Under the codename Project Swivel Chair, on March 3, 1954, 12 C-119s of the 483rd Troop Carrier Wing ("Packet Rats") based at Ashiya, Japan, were painted with France's insignia and loaned to France with 24 CIA pilots for short-term use. Maintenance was carried out by the US Air Force and airlift operations were commanded by McCarty.

Central Intelligence Agency covert operations (1954)

Twenty four Central Intelligence Agency (Civil Air Transport) pilots supplied the French Union garrison during the siege of Dien Bien Phu - airlifting paratroopers, ammunition, artillery pieces, tons of barbed wire, medics and other military materiel. With the reducing Drop zone areas, night operations and anti-aircraft artillery assaults, many of the "packets" fell into Việt Minh hands. The CIA pilots completed 682 airdrops under anti-aircraft fire between March 13 and May 6. Two CAT pilots, Wallace Bufford and James B. McGovern Jr. were killed in action when their Fairchild C-119 Flying Boxcar was shot down on May 6, 1954. On February 25, 2005, the French ambassador to the United States, Jean-David Levitte, awarded the seven remaining CIA pilots the Légion d'honneur.

Operation Passage to Freedom (1954)

In August 1954, in support of the French navy and the merchant navy, the U.S. Navy launched Operation Passage to Freedom and sent hundreds of ships, including , in order to evacuate non-communist—especially Catholic—Vietnamese refugees from North Vietnam following the July 20, 1954, armistice and partition of Vietnam. Up to 1 million Vietnamese civilians were transported from North to South during this period, with around one tenth of that number moving in the opposite direction.

Other assistance
 New Zealand
During 1952 and 1954 New Zealand provided from its obsolete and surplus (but serviceable) military stocks a selection of military equipment for the French Forces in Indochina, including:
 43,000 rifles
 1,350 machine guns
 670,000 rounds of small arms ammunition
 10,000 rounds of 40mm armour-piercing shot
 500 revolvers
 50 Bofors anti-aircraft guns and ammunition
 wireless sets
 field telephones
 charging sets
 various uniform items

Popular culture 

Although the war was largely treated with indifference in metropolitan France, "the dirty war" has been featured in various films, books and songs. Since its declassification in the 2000s, television documentaries have been released using new perspectives about the U.S. covert involvement and open critics about the French propaganda used during wartime.

The famous Communist propagandist Roman Karmen was in charge of the media exploitation of the battle of Dien Bien Phu. In his documentary, Vietnam (Вьетнам, 1955), he staged the famous scene with the raising of the Việt Minh flag over de Castries' bunker which is similar to the one he staged over the Berlin Reichstag roof during World War II (Берлин, 1945) and the "S"-shaped POW column marching after the battle, where he used the same optical technique he experimented with before when he staged the German prisoners after the Siege of Leningrad (Ленинград в борьбе, 1942) and the Battle of Moscow (Разгром немецких войск под Москвой, 1942).

Hollywood made a film about Dien Bien Phu in 1955, Jump into Hell, directed by David Butler and scripted by Irving Wallace, before his fame as a bestselling novelist. Hollywood also made several films about the war, Robert Florey's Rogues' Regiment (1948). Samuel Fuller's China Gate (1957). and James Clavell's Five Gates to Hell (1959).

The first French movie about the war, Shock Patrol (Patrouille de Choc) aka Patrol Without Hope (Patrouille Sans Espoir) by Claude Bernard-Aubert, came out in 1956. The French censor cut some violent scenes and made the director change the end of his movie which was seen as "too pessimistic". Léo Joannon's film Fort du Fou (Fort of the Mad) /Outpost in Indochina was released in 1963. Another film was The 317th Platoon (La 317ème Section) was released in 1964, it was directed by Indochina War (and siege of Dien Bien Phu) veteran Pierre Schoendoerffer. Schoendoerffer has since become a media specialist about the Indochina War and has focused his production on realistic war movies. He was cameraman for the army ("Cinematographic Service of the Armies", SCA) during his duty time; moreover, as he had covered the Vietnam War he released The Anderson Platoon, which won the Academy Award for Documentary Feature.

Graham Greene's novel The Quiet American takes place during this war.

In 2011 a Vietnamese software developer released a first-person-shooter called 7554. Named after the date 07-05-54 (7 May 1954) which marks the end of the decisive Battle of Dien Bien Phu, it commemorates the First Indochina War from the Vietnamese point of view.

The 2017 film by Olivier Lorelle, Ciel Rouge, starring Cyril Descours and Audrey Giacomini, is set during the early part of the First Indochina War.

See also

 Cambodian–Vietnamese War
 Hélie de Saint Marc
 Franco-Thai War
 Japanese invasion of French Indochina
 Japanese coup d'état in French Indochina
 Indochina Wars
 Mỹ Trạch massacre
 North Vietnamese invasion of Laos
 Second Indochina War
 Third Indochina War
 Pathet Lao
 United Issarak Front
 Mémorial des guerres en Indochine
 Algerian War

References

Sources

 
 
 
 
 
 
 
 
 
 
 
 
 
 
 
 
 
 
 
 
 
 
 
 
 
 
 
 
 
 
  Online search tool at UQÀM website.

Further reading

External links

 Pentagon Papers, Chapter 2 
 Vietnam: The Impossible War
 Fall, Bernard B. Street Without Joy: The French Debacle In Indochina
 ANAPI's official website (National Association of Former POWs in Indochina)
 Hanoi upon the army's return in victory (bicycles demystified) Viet Nam Portal
 Photos about the First War of Indochina (French Defense Archives) (ECPAD) 

 
1940s conflicts
1940s in French Indochina
1940s in Vietnam
1950s conflicts
1950s in French Indochina
1950s in Vietnam
20th century in France
20th century in Vietnam
Indochina01
Articles containing video clips
Indochina
Indochina
Indochina
French Indochina
1
Insurgencies in Asia
Invasions by France
Invasions of Vietnam
Proxy wars
Resistance to the French colonial empire
Indochina
Viet Minh
Vietnamese independence movement
Indochina
Wars involving France
Indochina
Indochina
Wars involving the Soviet Union
Wars involving the United States
Wars involving Vietnam
Guerrilla wars